B'nai Jacob Synagogue is a historic Conservative synagogue located at the intersection of Nissley and Water Streets, Middletown, Dauphin County, Pennsylvania. It was built in 1906, and is a one-story brick building with a front gabled roof.  The front facade features brick recessed panels with pointed arched windows and a circular window. Atop the front gable is a Star of David. It is the oldest building erected as a synagogue in Dauphin County.

It was added to the National Register of Historic Places in 1985.

See also 
 National Register of Historic Places listings in Dauphin County, Pennsylvania

References

External links

Synagogue website

Synagogues on the National Register of Historic Places in Pennsylvania
Synagogues completed in 1906
Conservative synagogues in Pennsylvania
Religious buildings and structures in Dauphin County, Pennsylvania
1906 establishments in Pennsylvania
National Register of Historic Places in Dauphin County, Pennsylvania